Caminos de Guanajuato is a Mexican telenovela produced by Javier Pons for TV Azteca. It is based on the Spanish soap opera Gran Reserva produced in 2010.

Iliana Fox and Erik Hayser star as the main protagonists, while Alejandra Lazcano and Alberto Guerra as the main antagonists.

Plot 
In a rich and beautiful wine-growing area, the producers of one are busy to achieve the best of wines, despite the adversities and competition. In those vineyards, cruelty and disloyalty have first and last name: Melchor Coronel. The Coronel are the wealthy owners of the Coronel wineries. Years ago, Melchor and his friend Alonso Rivero, boosted the production of wines in the region. But Melchor did not comply and wanted that bonanza for him only. And did deceive and depriving Alonso to leave it almost in ruin. The bodegas y vinedos Alonso survived thanks to its efforts, but the friendship was dead and buried.

Production 
Production of Caminos de Guanajuato officially started on February 23, 2015 in Buenos Aires, Argentina. The telenovela is known in the rest of the world as Olvidé que te quería, although it was formerly known as Cantando al corazón.

On May 7, 2015, Iliana Fox and Erik Hayser were invited to participate the program El hormiguero, where the main theme of the telenovela, is relieved the subject is portrayed by Concha Buika and the song is called "En el último trago".

Cast 
Iliana Fox as Florencia Rivero
Erik Hayser as Giberlto Coronel
Alejandra Lazcano as María Clara Portillo
Dolores Heredia as Magdalena Lozada
Álvaro Guerrero as Melchor Coronel
Alberto Guerra as Rómulo Coronel
Claudio Lafarga as Darío Rivero
Fabián Corres as Pascual Coronel
Israel Amescua as Ramón Coronel 
Sylvia Saenz as Olivia Peñalosa
Vanessa Acosta as Alba Coronel
Rodolfo Arias as Alonso Rivero
Emilio Guerrero as Chavero
Nohelia Betancourt as Celeste
Marco Pérez as Alfredo
Christian Vazquez as Celso
Ramiro Tomasini as Hernán
Pablo Olewski as Young Alonso
Alan Ciangherotti as Madero
Juanma Muñoz as José Ángel
Eduardo Mendoza Vargas as Mati

Mexico broadcast

Episodes

See also 
List of telenovelas of TV Azteca

References

External links 

 Official website

Mexican telenovelas
TV Azteca telenovelas
2015 telenovelas
2015 Mexican television series debuts
2015 Mexican television series endings
Mexican television series based on Spanish television series
Spanish-language telenovelas
Television series about wine